James Binder (August 2, 1902 –  July 25, 1979) was an American baseball third baseman in the Negro leagues. He played from 1930 to 1938 with multiple clubs, spending parts of five seasons with the Homestead Grays from 1933 to 1937.

References

External links
 and Baseball-Reference Black Baseball stats and Seamheads

Memphis Red Sox players
Indianapolis ABCs (1931–1933) players
Detroit Stars players
Homestead Grays players
Washington Elite Giants players
Pittsburgh Crawfords players
1902 births
1979 deaths
20th-century African-American sportspeople
Baseball infielders